Thomas Shaw is the name of:

Politicians
 Tom Shaw (politician) (1872–1938), British trade unionist and Labour Party politician
 Thomas Shaw (Halifax MP) (1823–1893), English Liberal politician, MP for Halifax
 Thomas Shaw, 1st Baron Craigmyle (1850–1937), Scottish politician and judge

Military
 Thomas Shaw (World War I veteran) (1899–2002), last Irish veteran of World War I
 Thomas Shaw (Medal of Honor) (1846–1895), American Indian Wars soldier

Music
 Thomas Shaw (blues musician) (1908–1977), blues musician
 Thomas Shaw (composer) (1752–1830), English composer
 Thomas Shaw, Canadian music producer with Project 46
 Tommy Shaw (born 1953), American guitarist

Others
 Thomas Shaw (divine and traveller) (1694–1751), born in Kendal, Westmoreland
 M. Thomas Shaw (1945–2014), American Episcopal bishop of Massachusetts
 Thomas Shaw, 3rd Baron Craigmyle (1923–1998), philanthropist
 Thomas Claye Shaw (1841–1927), British physician and hospital administrator
 Thomas Shaw (Methodist minister) (1916–2001), English author and historian

See also
 Tom Shaw (disambiguation)
 Thomas Shore (disambiguation)